LRCC can refer to:
 Lakes Region Community College, in New Hampshire, United States
 Law Reform Commission of Canada, a former government-backed law reform group in Canada
 Lomond Roads Cycling Club, a Scottish cycling club
 The London Radio Car Club, which meets at the Crystal Palace National Sports Centre
 The Ladera Ranch Civic Council, a volunteer group in Ladera Ranch, California
 Low Regulatory Concern Chemicals Reforms promulgated by the National Industrial Chemicals Notification and Assessment Scheme
 Leiomyomatosis renal cell cancer 
 An alias for Fumarase
 A license granted by the Royal College of Chiropractors